Alf Ottar Brubakk (24 January 1941 – 5 April 2022) was a Norwegian researcher and professor at the Faculty of Medicine and Health Sciences Department of Circulation and Imaging (ISB) of the Norwegian University of Science and Technology in Trondheim, Norway. He worked in the physiology of underwater diving, particularly decompression, was an advisor on diving physiology to the offshore diving industry, and a president of the European Underwater and Baromedical Society.

Early life and education
Brubakk originally wanted to be a marine biologist, but decided that he was more likely to get an interesting job if he studied medicine, which he did at Giessen in Germany, and after graduating, did his internship at a small island in West Norway.

He was approached by the head of the health service in Trondheim who offered him a research position financed by the county. He collaborated with Rune Aaslid from 1970 on a mathematical model of the cardiovascular system intended to be used clinically to obtain data that could not be measured directly in the patient. This work led to development of pulsed Doppler ultrasound equipment, for collecting data on the circulatory system, and which showed that blood flow velocity could be used to evaluate internal pressure in the heart non-invasively.

Career
Brubakk started his professional life in cardiology and then practiced for several years as an anesthesiologist, before being offered a job as Assistant Professor of Applied Physiology in Trondheim. Later he shifted to environmental physiology and diving medicine, and was professor of environmental physiology at the Norwegian University of Science and Technology in Trondheim. He researched decompression sickness (DCS) for more than 20 years and also studied other areas of environmental physiology, including the effects of cold and outer space.

The offshore oil exploration and production off Norway was in its early days and commercial diving became an important industry for Bergen, where the Norwegian Underwater Institute (Norwegian Underwater Intervention?) was established to do diving research. Brubakk joined the NUI, where experimental dives were done to about 500 m. He started some ultrasonic studies, as bubbles are a good reflector, though the thinking at the time was that bubbles were present but not important. Brubakk thought they would have some pathophysiological relevance. The first study showed significant vascular bubble presence in both venous and arterial circulation, but this was not considered when the next US Navy decompression tables were drawn up, as at the time, the US Navy tested the calculated profiles against an endpoint of symptomatic DCS. Studies of bubble formation and distribution during and after decompression have continued, and it remains a field of research as of 2022.

Brubakk was medical advisor to a major commercial diving company for over 35 years until 2015, was responsible for advice in diving procedures for Subsea 7, and was involved in diver training.

Brubakk was a long-time member and former president (2006-2009), of the European Underwater and Baromedical Society (EUBS).

Publications
Scientific papers:

 

 

</ref>

Books:

External links
List of publications: 204 total, at Current Research Information System In Norway

References

1941 births
2022 deaths
Academic staff of the Norwegian University of Science and Technology
Science of underwater diving
Norwegian scientists